Backlash: Misogyny in the Digital Age (French: Je vous salue salope : La mysogynie au temps du numérique) is a Canadian documentary feature film by Léa Clermont-Dion and Guylaine Maroist released in 2022.

Synopsis 
The film exposes the many consequences of online misogyny. It sheds lights on hatred towards women. This Canadian documentary feature by Clermont-Dion and Maroist, succeeds on being suspensful while it follows four women across two different continents: Laura Boldrini, former President of the Italian Chamber of Deputies; Kiah Morris, former Democratic representative; French actor and YouTuber Marion Séclin; and Laurence Gratton, a school teacher from Montréal.

Technical specifications 

 Original title: Je vous salue salope : La misogynie au temps du numérique
 English title: Backlash: Misogyny in the Digital Age
 Directed by: Léa Clermont-Dion, Guylaine Maroist
 Screenplay: Clermont-Dion, Maroist
 Original music: Antoine Félix Rochette
 Production: La Ruelle Films
 Country: Canada
 Genre: Documentary
 Length: 80 minutes
 Release date: September th 2022

Cast 

 Laura Boldrini
 Marion Séclin
 Kiah Morris (or Ruqaiyah Khadijah Kiah Morris)
 Laurence Gratton
 Glen Canning
 Laurence Rosier
 Donna Zuckerberg
 Nadia Seraiocco
 Sarah T. Roberts

References

External links 

 Official website  (English)
 Backlash: Misogyny at the Digital Age on the website of La Cinémathèque québécoise
 Backlash: Misogyny at the Digital Age on La Ruelle Films

2022 films
2022 documentary films
Canadian documentary films
Documentary films about misogyny
2020s Canadian films